In addition to Pope John Paul II, who served as president of the Second Extraordinary General Assembly of the Synod of Bishops in 1985, there were multiple other classes of participants.  Archbishop Jan Pieter Schotte, CICM, served as Secretary General, Cardinal Godfried Danneels was the Relator General, and the Rev. Walter Kasper was the Special Secretary. The delegate presidents were cardinals John Krol, Joseph Malula, and Johannes Willebrands. Overall, there were 165 cardinals, archbishops, and bishops and ten observer-delegates. No women were invited to participate.

Eastern Catholic Churches 

The Eastern Catholic Churches were represented by:

Representatives of episcopal conferences 
The following bishops were presidents or representatives of episcopal conferences. Unlike in ordinary general assemblies of the Synod of Bishops, where episcopal conferences can elect a bishop to represent them, in extraordinary general assemblies, the representative is almost always the episcopal conference's president.

Africa

The Americas

Asia

Europe

Oceania

Heads of the Dicasteries of the Roman Curia 
The following heads of the Dicasteries of the Roman Curia attended:

Papal invitees 

There were additional members invited by Pope John Paul II:

Fraternal delegates 
The following delegates represented non-Catholic organizations:

References 

Synod of bishops in the Catholic Church
Lists of Roman Catholic bishops and archbishops
1985 in Vatican City